Aer Turas Teoranta (from the Irish meaning Air Journey) was an Irish airline and later a  freight operator based in Dublin, Ireland, from 1962 until May 2003.

History
Aer Turas started operations in 1962 as an air taxi service from Ireland to the UK with a single de Havilland Dragon Rapide.
They soon began to focus on freight rather than passenger operations and were quite successful for many years.
In the 1980s Aer Lingus acquired a majority shareholding in Aer Turas. However a decade later, soaring insurance costs, increased competition and the turbulence following September 11th terrorist attacks in the USA all contributed to an overall operating loss and ultimately resulted in the company going into receivership.

Fleet

The airline began operations with a single de Havilland Dragon Rapide. Soon they expanded the fleet with Douglas DC-3, DC-4, DC-7, DC-8-63, Bristol 170 and  Canadair CL44 aircraft. Of the two remaining DC-8 aircraft, EI-CGO was sold to First International Airlines and EI-BNA was to be broken up for spares.

The last aircraft acquired for the fleet was passenger configured EI-CNN (formerly G-BAAA & VR-HHV) a Lockheed L-1011-385-1 TriStar 1 (cn 193K-1024) which had been delivered new to the Court Line, based at London Luton Airport, in February 1973. It was returned to Lockheed when Court Line ceased trading. In 1977 it became VR-HHV with Cathay Pacific and flew for them for 2 decades. Then to EI-CNN with Aer Turas working for TBG, Kampuchea and Air Scandic before being stored in 1998 at Abu Dhabi (AUH) pending a C-Check which never happened and was ultimately scrapped in 2006. This was a historically significant aircraft in that it was the first wide body in Europe with a charter operator and revolutionised the European aviation industry.

Aircraft operated

 de Havilland Dragon Rapide 1963
 Bristol Britannia
 Bristol Freighter
 Canadair CL-44 
 Douglas DC-3 1963
 Douglas DC-4 1965
 Douglas DC-7 1969–1971
 Douglas DC-8 ?-2003
 Hawker Siddeley Argosy 1971
 Lockheed Tristar

External links

Aer Turas Remembered

Defunct airlines of the Republic of Ireland
Airlines established in 1962
Airlines disestablished in 2003
2003 disestablishments in Ireland
Irish companies established in 1962